The Kenneth Slessor Prize for Poetry is awarded annually as part of the New South Wales Premier's Literary Awards for a book of collected poems or for a single poem of substantial length published in book form. It is named after Kenneth Slessor (1901–1971).

The prize currently comes with a A$30,000 cash award.

Winners and shortlists

2023 

 Adam Aitken – Revenants
 Pam Brown – Stasis Shuffle
 Kim Cheng Boey – The Singer and Other Poems
 Lisa Gorton – Miribilia
 Sarah Holland-Batt – The Jaguar
 Marjon Mossammaparast – And to Ecstacy

2022 

 Winner: Dan Disney – accelerations & inertias
 Eunice Andrada – TAKE CARE
 Evelyn Araluen – Dropbear
 Eileen Chong – A Thousand Crimson Blooms
 John Kinsella – Supervivid Depastoralism
 Bella Li – Theory of Colours

2021 

 Winner: Ellen van Neerven – Throat
Jordie Albiston – Element: The Atomic Weight & Radius of Love 
 Rebecca Jessen – Ask Me About the Future
 Jill Jones – A History of What I’ll Become
 Jaya Savige – Change Machine

2020 

 Winner: Peter Boyle – Enfolded in the Wings of a Great Darkness
 Joanne Burns – apparently
 Zenobia Frost – After the Demolition
Lisa Gorton – Empirical
 Natalie Harkin – Archival-Poetics
 David Malouf – An Open Book

2019 

 Winner: Judith Bishop – Interval
 Michael Farrell – I Love Poetry
 Penelope Layland – Things I’ve Thought To Tell You Since I Saw You Last
 Philip Neilsen – Wildlife of Berlin
 Mark Reid – Blindside
 Chris Wallace-Crabbe – Rondo

2018 

 Winner: Bella Li – Argosy
 Adam Aitken – Archipelago
 Jordie Albiston – Euclid's dog: 100 algorithmic poems
 Rico Craig – Bone Ink
 Nguyễn Tiên Hoàng – Captive and Temporal
 Omar Sakr – These Wild Houses

2017 

 Winner: Peter Boyle – Ghostspeaking
 Paul Hetherington – Burnt Umber
 Jill Jones – Breaking the Days
 Antigone Kefala – Fragments
 John Kinsella – Firebreaks: Poems
 Ellen van Neerven – Comfort Foot

2016 

 Winner: Joanne Burns – brush
 Lionel Fogarty – Eelahroo (Long Ago), Nyah (Looking), Möbö-Möbö (Future)
 Sarah Holland-Batt – The Hazards
 Meredith Wattison – terra bravura
 Chloe Wilson – Not Fox Nor Axe
 Ouyang Yu – Fainting

2015 

 Winner: David Malouf – Earth Hour
 Michael Aiken – A Vicious Example
 Judith Beveridge – Devadatta's Poems
 Anne Elvey – Kin
 Libby Hart – Wild
 John Mateer – Unbelievers, or The Moor

2014
Winner: Fiona Hile – Novelties, Hunter
 Justin Clemens – The Mundiad, Hunter
 Diane Fahey – The Stone Garden: poems from Clare, Clouds of Magellan
 Liam Ferney – Boom, Grand Parade Poets
 Kate Middleton – Ephemeral Waters, Giramondo Publishing
 Jessica Wilkinson – Marionette: A biography of Miss Marion Davies, Vagabond Press

2013
Winner: Ali Cobby-Eckermann – Ruby Moonlight, Magabala Books
 Kate Fagan – First Light, Giramondo Publishing
 Michael Farrell – Open Sesame, Giramondo Publishing
 Anthony Lawrence – The Welfare of my Enemy, Puncher & Wattman
 Kate Lilley – Ladylike, UWA Publishing
 Vivian Smith – Here, There and Elsewhere, Giramondo Publishing

2012
Winner: Gig Ryan – New and Selected Poems, Giramondo Publishing
 Ken Bolton – Sly Mongoose, Puncher and Wattman
 Susan Hawthorne – Cow, Spinifex Press
 John Mateer – Southern Barbarians, Giramondo Publishing
 Claire Potter – Swallow, Five Islands Press
 Tracy Ryan – The Argument, Fremantle Press

2011
Winner: Jennifer Maiden – Pirate Rain, Giramondo Publishing
 Susan Bradley Smith – Supermodernprayerbook, Salt Publishing
 Andy Jackson – Among The Regulars, Papertiger Media Inc
 Jill Jones – Dark Bright Doors, Wakefield Press Pty
 Anna Kerdijk Nicholson – Possession, Five Island Press
 Andy Kissane – Out to Lunch, Puncher and Wattmann

2010
Winner: Jordie Albiston – The Sonnet According to "M"
 Emily Ballou – The Darwin Poems
 Judith Beveridge – Storm and Honey
 Emma Jones – The Striped World
 Morgan Yasbincek – White Camel

2009
Winner: LK Holt – Man Wolf Man, John Leonard Press.
 Michael Brennan – Unanimous Night, Salt Publishing
 David Brooks – The Balcony, University of Queensland Press
 Sarah Holland-Batt – Aria, University of Queensland Press
 Kerry Leves – A Shrine To Lata Mangeshkar, Puncher & Wattman
 Alan Wearne – The Australian Popular Songbook, Giramondo

2008
Winner: Kathryn Lomer – Two Kinds of Silence
 Joanne Burns – an illustrated history of dairies
 Brook Emery – Uncommon Light
 Peter Kirkpatrick – Westering
 David Malouf – Typewriter Music
 Phyllis Perlstone – The Edge of Everything

2007
Winner: John Tranter – Urban Myths, University of Queensland Press
 Robert Adamson – The Goldfinches of Baghdad, Flood Editions
 Laurie Duggan – The Passenger, University of Queensland Press
 Les Murray – The Biplane Houses, Black Inc.
 Simon West – First Names, Puncher and Wattmann
 Fay Zwicky – Picnic, Giramondo Publishing Company

2006
Winner: Jaya Savige – Latecomers, University of Queensland Press.
 Aidan Coleman – Avenues & Runways, Brandl & Schlesinger
 Susan Hampton – The Kindly Ones, Five Islands Press
 Jill Jones – Broken/Open, Salt Publishing
 Penelope Layland – Suburban Anatomy, Pandanus Books
 David McCooey – Blister Pack, Salt Publishing

2005
 Winner: Samuel Wagan Watson – Smoke Encrypted Whispers, University of Queensland Press
 M. T. C. Cronin – < More or Less Than> 1–100, Shearsman Books Ltd
 Lidija Cvetkovic – War is Not the Season for Figs, University of Queensland Press
 John Kinsella – Doppler Effect, Salt Publishing
 Dipti Saravanamuttu – The Colosseum, Five Islands Press
 Alan Wearne – The Lovemakers Book Two: Money and Nothing, ABC Books

2004
 Winner: Pam Brown – Dear Deliria: New & Selected Poems, Salt Publishing
 Jordie Albiston – The Fall, White Crane Press
 M. T. C. Cronin – beautiful, unfinished Salt Publishing
 Brook Emery – Misplaced Heart, Five Islands Press
 Philip Hammial – In the Year of Our Lord Slaughter's Children, Island Press
 John Tranter – Studio Moon, Salt Publishing

2003
 Winner: Jill Jones – Screens Jets Heaven
 Alison Croggon – Attempts at Being
 Kate Lilley – Versary
 Emma Lew – Anything the Landlord Touches
 Sarah Day – New and Selected Poems
 Robert Gray – Afterimages

2002
 Winner: Alan Wearne – The Lovemakers, Penguin Books Australia
 Robert Adamson – Mulberry Leaves: New & Selected Poems: 1970–2001, Paper Bark Press
 Martin Harrison – Summer, Paper Bark Press
 Dorothy Hewett – Halfway Up the Mountain, Fremantle Arts Centre Press
 Bronwyn Lea – Flight Animals, University of Queensland Press
 Gig Ryan – Heroic Money, Brandl & Schlesinger
 John Tranter – Ultra, Brandl & Schlesinger

2001
 Winner: Ken Taylor – Africa, Five Islands Press
 Jennifer Compton – Blue, Ginninderra Press
 Brook Emery – and dug my fingers in the sand, Five Islands Press
 Philip Hammial – Bread, Black Pepper
 J. S. Harry – Sun Shadow, Moon Shadow, Vagabond Press
 Wendy Jenkins – Rogue Equations, Fremantle Arts Centre Press

2000
 Winner: Jennifer Maiden – Mines, Paper Bark Press/Australian Humanities Research Foundation
 Richard James Allen – Thursday's Fictions, Five Islands Press
 M. T. C. Cronin – Everything Holy, Balcones International Press
 Jennifer Harrison – Dear B, Black Pepper
 Kevin Hart – Wicked Heat, Paper Bark Press
 John Millett – Iceman, Five Islands Press

1999 and before
Award winners:
 1999: Lee Cataldi – Race Against Time, Penguin Books Australia
 1998: no awards were presented
 1997: Anthony Lawrence – The Viewfinder, University of Queensland Press
 1996: Eric Beach – Weeping for Lost Babylon, HarperCollins and J. S. Harry – Selected Poems, Penguin Books Australia
 1995: Peter Boyle – Coming Home From the World, Five Islands Press
 1994: Barry Hill – Ghosting William Buckley, William Heinemann Australia
 1993: Les Murray – Translations from the Natural World, Isabella Press
 1992: Elizabeth Riddell – Selected Poems, Collins Angus & Robertson
 1991: Jennifer Maiden – The Winter Baby, Collins Angus & Robertson
 1990: Robert Adamson – The Clean Dark, Paper Bark Press
 1989: John Tranter – Under Berlin, University of Queensland Press
 1988: Judith Beveridge – The Domesticity of Giraffes, Black Lightning Press
 1987: Philip Hodgins – Blood and Bone, Angus & Robertson
 1986: Robert Gray – Selected Poems 1963–83, Angus & Robertson
 1985: Kevin Hart – Your Shadow, Angus & Robertson
 1984: Les Murray – The People's Other World, Angus & Robertson
 1983: Vivian Smith – Tide Country, Angus & Robertson
 1982: Fay Zwicky – Kaddish and Other Poems, University of Queensland Press
 1981: Alan Gould – Astral Sea, Angus & Robertson
 1980: David Campbell – Man in the Honeysuckle, Angus & Robertson

See also
Australian literature
List of poetry awards
List of years in poetry
List of years in literature

Notes

Australian poetry awards
Awards established in 1979
Lists of award winners
Kenneth Slessor